Michael Denzil Livock (26 July 1936 – 1999) was an English first-class cricketer.

The son of the Cambridgeshire minor counties cricketer Denzil Livock, he was born at Surbiton. He was later educated at Charterhouse School. Livock made two appearances in first-class cricket for the Free Foresters in 1960, playing against Oxford University and Cambridge University. He scored a total of 12 runs while batting, while his right-arm fast bowling he took 8 wickets at an average of 29.37, with best figures of 4 for 71.

He died in France in 1999. His uncle was the noted first-class cricketer, pilot and archaeologist Gerald Livock.

References

External links

1936 births
1999 deaths
People from Surbiton
People educated at Charterhouse School
English cricketers
Free Foresters cricketers